Layton station may refer to:

 Layton railway station (England), in Layton, Lancashire, England
 Layton station (FrontRunner), in Layton, Utah, United States

See also
 Leyton tube station, Greater London
 Leyton Midland Road railway station, Greater London